Penstemon anguineus is a species of penstemon known by the common name Siskiyou beardtongue. It is native to the mountains of Oregon and northern California, where it grows in coniferous forests, often in open areas left by logging operations. It is a perennial herb reaching up to about 90 centimeters in maximum height. The oppositely arranged leaves are lance-shaped to oval, the ones higher on the plant clasping the stem. The inflorescence produces several light blue or purple flowers between 1 and 2 centimeters long. The sepals and flowers are coated in glandular hairs. The inside of the flower has many long hairs and the staminode has a sparse hair coating.

External links

anguineus
Flora of California
Flora of Oregon
Flora of the United States
Flora without expected TNC conservation status